Wilhelmine Louise, Princess Reuss of Greiz, born as Princess Wilhelmine Luise of Nassau-Weilburg (28 September 1765, in The Hague – 10 October 1837, in Greiz) was a German princess. She was a Princess-consort of Reuss of Greiz from 1800 until 1817, and was a daughter of Prince Charles Christian, Duke of Nassau-Weilburg and Carolina of Orange-Nassau, daughter of William IV, Prince of Orange.

Marriage and children
Louise married on 9 January 1786 in Kirchheimbolanden to Heinrich XIII, future Prince Reuss of Greiz (1747–1817), third child of Heinrich XI, Prince Reuss of Greiz , and his wife, Countess Conradine Reuss of Köstritz (daughter of Heinrich XXIV, Count Reuss of Köstritz and Baroness Marie Eleonore Emma of Promnitz-Dittersbach).

They had four children:
 Prince Heinrich XVIII Reuss of Greiz (31 March 1787 – 31 March 1787)
 Unnamed daughter (28 November 1788 – 28 November 1788)
 Heinrich XIX, Prince Reuss of Greiz (1 March 1790 – 31 October 1836), married in 1822 to Princess Gasparine of Rohan-Rochefort, had issue.
 Heinrich XX, Prince Reuss of Greiz (29 June 1794 – 8 November 1859), married firstly in 1834 to Princess Sophie of Löwenstein-Wertheim- Rosenberg, no issue, Princess Sophie died in 1838; Married secondly in 1839 to Landgravine Karoline of Hesse-Homburg, had issue.

Ancestry

External links
 dr. A.W.E. Dek, Genealogie van het Vorstenhuis Nassau, Europese Bibliotheek, Zaltbommel, 1970.
 Michel Huberty, Alain Giraud, F. & B. Magdelaine, l’Allemagne Dynastique. Tome I Hesse-Reuss-Saxe, Alain Giraud, Le Perreux, 1976.
 Michel Huberty, Alain Giraud, F. & B. Magdelaine, l’Allemagne Dynastique. Tome III Brunswick-Nassau-Schwarzbourg, Alain Giraud, Le Perreux, 1981.

House of Nassau-Weilburg
1765 births
1837 deaths
Nobility from The Hague
Princesses of Nassau-Weilburg
Princesses of Reuss
Daughters of monarchs